Lighthouse of Isla Verde is an inactive lighthouse in Algeciras, Spain.
It is located at the southern end of an old fort, on Isla Verde, an island that has been incorporated into the Port of Algeciras. The lighthouse was designed and built by Jaime Font in 1863 and inaugurated in 1864. It is a polygonal stone tower, plastered with lime. The focal plane is 26 m above mean sea level and 9 m above the ground. Today the lighthouse is not in service as it has been replaced by beacons at the port.

See also

 List of lighthouses in Spain

References

External links
 Comisión de faros 

Lighthouses completed in 1863
Lighthouses in Andalusia
Buildings and structures in Algeciras